Three Meals a Day is a South Korean reality cooking show broadcast on tvN. The cast live in a small rural or fishing village for three days a week and are tasked to use whatever food they find there to cook three meals a day. They also experience village life while interacting with the locals and entertain various celebrity guests for dinner.    

Nine seasons aired from October 2014 to July 2020 on Friday nights at various time slots. Each season featured different locations and casts, according to various themes. There are four themes in total: Jeongseon Village and Fishing Village, which recur across multiple seasons; Gochang Village; and an all-female cast edition Mountain Village.    

Two web spin-offs featuring various cast members of New Journey to the West were also produced and released on producer Na Young-seok's YouTube channel. Three Meals in Iceland was released from September 20 to November 29, 2019, while Three Meals a Day for Four, featuring Sechs Kies, was released from May 15 to July 24, 2020.  

In October 2021, a third spin-off was released for television broadcast, featuring the cast of hit drama series Hospital Playlist.

Production
The idea for Three Meals a Day came about from a joke on Grandpas Over Flowers, which producer-director Na Young-seok and actor Lee Seo-jin had worked together on previously. Due to his poor cooking skills while filming Grandpas Over Flowers, the production crew jokingly nicknamed Lee the "Cooking King." This became a running gag about Lee starring in a fake cooking show titled Cooking King Seo-jinnie, a parody of the popular drama series King of Baking, Kim Takgu, which eventually materialised into Three Meals a Day. 

Lee was cast for the first season of the series, also the first of the Jeongseon Village editions, alongside former Wonderful Days co-star Ok Taecyeon. In the second Jeongseon Village edition, former guest Kim Kwang-kyu joined the two as a regular cast member. On top of the regular cooking premise, the trio were given the additional task of growing and harvesting crops from spring to early fall, with grocery shopping strictly prohibited. 

The first four seasons of Three Meals a Day in 2014 and 2015 alternated between the Jeongseon Village and Fishing Village editions, showcasing different seasons in different locations. Cha Seung-won, Yoo Hae-jin and Son Ho-jun formed a separate cast for the first two Fishing Village editions. In 2016, this cast filmed in a new location for the standalone Gochang Village edition, alongside new member Nam Joo-hyuk. 

Later in October 2016, it was announced that Lee Seo-jin would return for a new season, a year after his last appearance in Jeongseon Village 2. New cast members Eric Mun and Yoon Kyun-sang joined him for Fishing Village 3, filmed on a new island location. The same cast returned in 2017 to the same location, but were tasked with island farming instead of fishing, hence the Seaside Ranch subtitle for the fourth Fishing Village edition. 

On July 1, 2019, it was confirmed that actresses Yum Jung-ah, Yoon Se-ah and Park So-dam had joined the first all-female cast for the Mountain Village edition, which began airing in August. 

In 2020, the original Fishing Village cast returned for the theme's fifth edition. Unlike previous editions, this season was filmed on an uninhabited island due to the ongoing COVID-19 pandemic and the need for social distancing.

Overview

Cast 

Three Meals a Day: Mountain Village

 Yum Jung-ah
 Yoon Se-ah
 Park So-dam

List of episodes, guests and ratings
In the tables below,  represent the lowest ratings of the season and  represent the highest ratings of the season.

Jeongseon Village

Jeongseon Village 1 

In the first episode, the production crew introduces the below rules for the cast's village experience:

 All ingredients used, except rice, must come from their farm
 Every meal has to follow a pre-determined menu
 Preparation for winter should be undertaken during their free time
 Cell phones will be taken away to aid integration into farming life

Jeongseon Village 2

Fishing Village

Fishing Village 1

Fishing Village 2

Fishing Village 3

Seaside Ranch (Fishing Village 4)

Fishing Village 5

Gochang Village 

After two Fishing Village editions, Cha Seung-won, Yoo Hae-jin and Son Ho-jun are reunited in their first inland location in Gochang-gun, joined by Nam Joo-hyuk. In order to buy groceries, they have to provide farm labour for which they are paid hourly wages. Through the series, they experience various farming activities: planting rice, rearing ducks, and picking black raspberries, watermelons, sweet potatoes, grapes, muskmelons and pears.

Mountain Village

Reception 
Three Meals a Day drew a great response from Korean viewers and became a trending topic numerous times on Naver, a Korean search portal. It received viewership ratings of 6%, which is high for Korean cable television for which a 1% rating is considered a success.

Originally 8 episodes were planned for the first season, but the show was extended by two episodes. A "director's cut" epilogue also aired, for a total of 11 episodes.

The table below charts viewership numbers according to Nielsen Korea; data for 2017 and earlier is not provided. Individual episode ratings can be viewed by season in the episode lists above.

Spin-offs 
The first two spin-offs of Three Meals a Day were "hybrid" programs produced for both online release and television broadcast. Short highlight videos between 5 to 15 minutes were broadcast on tvN, with the full episodes released on "Channel 15ya", a YouTube channel run by producer Na Young-seok and his team. Both spin-offs were born from New Journey to the West, another series produced by producer Na, and feature some of its cast. 

In October 2021, a third spin-off was released for television broadcast featuring the main cast of drama series Hospital Playlist: Jo Jung-suk, Yoo Yeon-seok, Jung Kyung-ho, Kim Dae-myung and Jeon Mi-do. The series is titled Wise Mountain Village Life, borrowing on the drama's title, but is commonly known in English as Three Meals a Day: Doctors. It was filmed in Jeongseon-gun, Gangwon-do and aired on tvN from October 8 to December 3, 2021 at 20:50 – 22:25 (KST) every Friday, with a total of 9 episodes.

Awards and nominations

Notes

References

External links
Three Meals a Day: Jeongseon Village 1 & 2 
Three Meals a Day: Fishing Village 2 
Three Meals a Day: Fishing Village 3 
Three Meals a Day: Seaside Ranch (Fishing Village 4) 
Three Meals a Day: Fishing Village 5 
Three Meals a Day: Gochang Village 
Three Meals a Day: Mountain Village 
Three Meals a Day: Doctors 

2014 South Korean television series debuts
2021 South Korean television series endings
TVN (South Korean TV channel) original programming
South Korean variety television shows
South Korean reality television series
Korean-language television shows
South Korean cooking television series